The Chicago and Northwestern Railroad Depot was built by the Chicago and Northwestern Railroad (C&NW) in the early 1900s. It is located at the south end of the business district in Brookings, South Dakota. The building is a rectangular single-story brick patternbook style building with some classical features.

The C&NW first entered Brookings in 1879. The depot opened February 1, 1905 and functioned as a passenger station until 1960.

The depot was listed in the National Register of Historic Places because of its architecture and also because of its association with the development of Brookings.

References
French, Edith. Chicago and Northwestern Railroad Depot at Brookings National Register of Historic Places Registration Form, National Park Service, Washington, DC, 1975.

Railway stations on the National Register of Historic Places in South Dakota
Brookings, South Dakota
Railway stations in the United States opened in 1905
Transportation in Brookings County, South Dakota
National Register of Historic Places in Brookings County, South Dakota
Railway stations closed in 1960
Former railway stations in South Dakota